Xi'an City People's Stadium (Simplified Chinese: 西安市人民体育场) is a multi-use stadium in Xi'an, China.  It is currently used mostly for football matches.  The stadium holds 18,000 people. This stadium was built on 8 October 1952.

References

Football venues in China
Buildings and structures in Xi'an
Sport in Xi'an
Sports venues in Shaanxi
Sports venues completed in 1952